During the 1991–92 English football season, Wimbledon competed in the Football League First Division. They finished the season 13th in the First Division and secured a place in the new FA Premier League for the 1992–93 season.

Season summary
Wimbledon had three different managers during this season. The season began with Ray Harford as manager, but Harford resigned on 7 October 1991. He was succeeded by Peter Withe, who was in charge for just over three months before being replaced by Joe Kinnear on 19 January 1992.

Final league table

Results
Wimbledon's score comes first

Legend

Football League First Division

FA Cup

League Cup

Full Members Cup

Squad

Transfers

In

Out

Transfers in:  £785,000
Transfers out:  £2,500,000
Total spending:  £1,715,000

References

Wimbledon F.C. seasons
Wimbledon